The Persian famine of 1917–1919 was a period of widespread mass starvation and disease in Persia (Iran) under the rule of the Qajar dynasty during World War I. The famine took place in the territory of Iran, which despite declaring neutrality was occupied by the forces of British, Russian and Ottoman empires whose occupation contributed to the famine. So far, few historians have researched the famine, making it an understudied subject of modern history.

According to the estimates acknowledged by the mainstream view, about 2 million people died between 1917 and 1919 because of hunger and from diseases, which included cholera, plague and typhus, as well as influenza infected by 1918 flu pandemic. A variety of factors are commented to have caused and contributed to the famine, including successive seasonal droughts, requisitioning and confiscation of foodstuffs by occupying armies, speculation, hoarding, war profiteering, and poor harvests.

Background

In November 1915, the price of one kharvar (100 kilos) of wheat increased to twenty tomans, "if there [was] any to be found", after the total granary of the south-east province of Sistan was sold off to the British troops. Russian troops blockaded all the roads in the north-east province of Khorasan, prohibiting any transfers of grain, except those destined for the Russian army. The requisitioning of pack animals, mules and camels for the oil industry in Khuzestan, and for the British and Russian armed forces, left the country's transport network in serious disarray, and disrupted the distribution of foodstuffs and other goods throughout the country – with disastrous consequences. During the war, it often cost more to transport grain than to grow it, in many parts of Iran. All this made the living conditions of the poor even more dreadful.

Spread

A series of severe droughts from 1916 on further depleted agricultural supplies.
By early February 1918, the famine spread throughout the country, and panicked crowds in major cities began to loot bakeries and food stores. In the western city of Kermanshah, confrontations between the hungry poor and the police ended in casualties. In Tehran, the situation was "aggravated by hoarding and short-selling to the customers by bakers".

Adulteration of bread, as well as the exorbitant prices charged by some bakers, outraged Tehran's working poor. Thus, for example, the printing-house workers, who had recently formed a union, staged a demonstration in Tehran in 1919, during which crowds attacked the bakeries and granaries, and called on the government to increase food rations, to standardize the price of bread, and to regulate the quality, supply and sales of foodstuffs. Nevertheless, in the turbulent post-war era neither the national government nor foreign powers were in a position to do much to alleviate the human crises. The devastation caused by famine and contagious diseases continued for many years.

Cases of cannibalism were also reported.

Outbreak of diseases 
Beyond deaths from starvation, epidemics also killed large numbers of people.

The colossal food crisis, plus large numbers of soldiers, refugees and destitute people constantly on the move in search of work and survival, facilitated a deadly combination of pandemics and contagious diseases. Cholera, the plague and typhus spread with terrifying speed across the country.

Influenza 

The 1918 flu pandemic spread to the entire country via three main entry routes: Transcaucasia to Tabriz, Baghdad to Kermanshah and India to the south Iran (the latter significantly vected by the British Indian Army soldiers stationed in Bushehr). The rural areas were more affected than urban regions, in which as many as 20% of the people were reported to have died. Azizi et al comment that the figure is exaggerated, adding that the mortality rate in Kermanshah and Tehran was about 1%. Afkhami states that the flu impact was enormous and estimates that between 902,400 and 2,431,000 or 8.0% and 21.7% of the total population died, making Iran one of the most devastated countries worldwide. Floor assessed the figure estimated by Afkhami is much higher than the real casualties.

Cholera 
In 1916, cholera that hit Azerbaijan in 1915, was widespread not only in all northern provinces, it also reached the south. In 1917, it appeared in Mazandaran and Khorasan, killing 188 and 308 people in the two regions respectively, according to a 1924 government report. Ahmad Seyf states that the origin of cholera outbreak was Russia, and It was not severe.

Typhoid and Typhus
Typhoid spread in many parts of the country, and caused enough deaths that, according to an eyewitness, "the high mortality in Tehran was not due to famine, but rather because of typhoid and typhus".

Causes and contributing factors
According to Touraj Atabaki, "successive seasonal droughts caused widespread famine during 1917/1918. Requisition and confiscation of foodstuffs by occupying armies to feed their soldiers added to the famine". In The Cambridge History of Iran, it is stated that speculation and hoarding made the situation worse. Michael Axworthy believes that the famine was "partly as a result of the dislocation of trade and agricultural production caused by the war". Tammy M. Proctor comments that the cause for food shortage was a combination of army requisitioning, war profiteering, hoarding and poor harvests.

Nikki Keddie and Yann Richard related the famine to almost all of the factors mentioned above.

Charles P. Melville maintains that the main reason of the famine were the conditions caused by the War.

Mohammad Gholi Majd, holds the British occupation and its custom and finance regulations accountable for worsening the famine, and Willem Floor suggests James L. Barton's account (occupation by armies, exceptionally light snowfall and disease), joint with hoarding by landowners and lack of purchasing power as other crucial causes of famine. According to him, two major grain producing areas, namely Kermanshah–Hamadan and Azarbaijan were the battlefield between the Ottomans and the Russians.

Pat Walsh in a review of Majd's book written in Irish Foreign Affairs, a quarterly publication by Irish Political Review blames the British occupation and comments on claims of hoarding as causes of famine, writing "British attitudes towards the starving Persians were uncannily similar to those expressed against the Irish in a similar position half a century before", i.e. the British blamed Persians while suggesting that building roads for their military was a ‘relief measure’ motivated by benevolence.

Rob Johnson blames bad governance and wartime shortages for the famine.

Death toll
Scholars such as Ervand Abrahamian, Homa Katouzian and Barry Rubin maintain that the total death toll due to starvation and disease was around 2 million.
Central Intelligence Agency analysts Steven R. Ward and Kenneth M. Pollack state a similar number. Nikki Keddie and Yann Richard state that about one-quarter of the population of northern Iran were killed.

Mohammad Gholi Majd's book, The Great Famine and Genocide in Persia, 1917–1919, identifies a number of allied sources that detail the proportion and scale of the deaths, and alleges that as many as 8–10 million died, across the whole nation, based on an alternate pre-famine Persian population estimate of 19 million. Timothy C. Winegard and Pordeli et al. acknowledge the figures suggested by Majd. Several scholars have disputed Majd's account.

Ervand Abrahamian comments that the book includes an "exaggerated discussion" of losses during the famine, a view he shares with Mahmood Messkoub, Abbas Milani and Rudi Matthee. Abrahamian describes calling the famine a genocide as "wild accusation" and attributes the vast majority of the 2 million deaths he estimates to cholera and typhus epidemics, as well as mostly worldwide influenza pandemic. While accepting that the total death toll could be several millions, Hormoz Ebrahimnejad says Majd's figure is an overestimation.

Cormac Ó Gráda, discussing the difficulty of verifying the death toll of historical famines, describes the claim of genocide as "not possible to take literally": "Such claims are usually rhetorical, and sure signs of major disasters, but poor guides to actual mortality." A similar view is expressed by Alidad Mafinezam and Aria Mehrabi, who state that Majd's work suffers from methodological defects, including lack of triangulation.

Reaction
During the famine years, several politicians served as Prime Minister and all adopted interventionist policies.
In order to control the situation of food supply, the government in Persia appointed Abdollah Mostowfi as chief of the alimentation service (raʾīs-e arzāq) in October 1916, before his later boss Mokhber al-Saltaneh took office as the minister for alimentation (vazīr-e arzāq) in October 1917. Siham al-Dawlah became chief of the bakery bureau (raʾīs-e nānvāʾī) in 1918 and an alimentation committee (komīté-ye arzāq) was also formed out of seven or eight influential merchants. The committee met daily and assisted the government with advise, including a proposal to introduce government incentive for bread.

In 1918, the United States rejected the request of Persian government for a $2 million loan dedicated to famine relief.

Members of the Jungle movement sheltered refugees who came to Gilan from other parts of the country and founded a charity to help them. They also sent several tons of rice to the capital. In Tabriz, the Democrats who were armed suppressed hoarders and speculators while organizing the relief.

Congregational prayers for rain were observed during the famine, including those of Mashhad in 1917, where babies and animals were also brought.

In Tabriz, medical missionary William Summerill Vanneman was appointed by the U.S. consul to be chairman of the Tabriz relief committee. In this role, he communicated with Secretary of State Robert Lansing and U.S. Ambassador Henry Morgenthau to manage funds sent by the American Committee for Armenian and Syrian Relief, now known as the Near East Foundation.

Contemporary perceptions 

In recent years, the famine has been subject to conspiracy theories, polarization and historical revisionism in Iran. Much of the controversy is about the death toll and root causes, and lack of sufficient data on this period has been described as the "principal driver" for it.
The official website of Ali Khamenei, Iran's supreme leader, published an article in 2015 asserting the view that the famine was a deliberate act of genocide committed by the British, whose documents have been intentionally wiped out in a cover-up attempt.
The British Broadcasting Corporation (BBC) produced and aired a documentary on the famine, which was condemned by conservatives in Iran as a ploy to minimise British role and underline the feebleness of Iran.

Depictions
 The Orphanage of Iran (2016)

References

Footnotes

Sources

 
 
 
  – Open access material by the Psychiatry and Behavioral Sciences at Health Sciences Research Commons.
 
 
  – Open access material licensed under the CC by-NC-ND 3.0 Germany.
 
 
 
 
 
 
 
 
 </noinclude>
 
 
 
 
 
 
 
 
 
 
 
 
  – Open access material licensed under the Creative Commons Attribution 4.0.
 
 
 
 
 
 

Famines in Iran
1910s health disasters
1917 disasters in Iran
1918 disasters in Iran
1919 disasters in Iran
1917 in Iran
1918 in Iran
1919 in Iran
Spanish flu
Middle Eastern theatre of World War I
20th-century famines
Qajar Iran
1910s disasters in Iran